The Kansas Wing of Civil Air Patrol (CAP) is the highest echelon of Civil Air Patrol in the state of Kansas. Kansas Wing headquarters are located in Salina, Kansas. The Kansas Wing consists of nearly 400 cadet and adult members at 9 locations across the state of Kansas.

Mission
The Kansas Wing performs the three missions of Civil Air Patrol: providing emergency services; offering cadet programs for youth; and providing aerospace education for both CAP members and the general public.

Emergency services
Civil Air Patrol performs search and rescue , disaster relief, humanitarian service, and Air Force support missions, as well as homeland security and counter-drug operations. The Kansas Wing assisted the neighboring Oklahoma Wing in their response to the Moore, Oklahoma  tornado by assisting with ground team photography of the tornado's path.

In March 2020, Kansas Wing members reported to Kansas' Emergency Operations Center to augment logistics and planning staff in response to the COVID-19 pandemic. Shortly thereafter, members began transporting lab specimens from rural and remote areas to the Kansas Department of Emergency Management's laboratory in Topeka.

Cadet programs
Civil Air Patrol provides cadet programs for youth aged 12-21 training in leadership, aerospace education, communication, and emergency services. Cadets receive training at weekly squadron meetings as well as through participating in local and wing level activities throughout the year. Cadets have the opportunity to attend encampments which provide a week of immersion training at a military installation.

Aerospace education
Civil Air Patrol provides aerospace education to both members of Civil Air Patrol and the public. Education provided to members is offered through the cadet program and through specialized education to CAP pilots. Education provided to the public is offered through educational materials provided to schools and private organizations.

Organization
The Kansas Wing does not utilize the optional "Group" structure. Instead, all squadrons report to the Kansas Wing directly.

See also
United States Air Force
Kansas Air National Guard
Kansas Army National Guard
Kansas State Guard

References

External links
Kansas Wing Civil Air Patrol official website

Wings of the Civil Air Patrol
Education in Kansas
Military in Kansas